Antonio Salviati (18 March 1816 – 25 January 1890) was an Italian glass manufacturer and founder of the Salviati family firm.

Biography 
A native of Vicenza, Salviati was a lawyer who became interested in glass work after participating in restorations being done on the mosaics of Saint Mark's Cathedral in Venice. He opened his first glass business in 1859 with Lorenzo Radi, and this firm produced the mosaic glass for the altar screen for the high altar of Westminster Abbey. In 1876, he left this business to establish a new firm which executed the mosaic decoration of the dome of Aachen Cathedral. The designs of this cathedral were based on the ideas of the Belgian architect Jean-Baptiste de Bethune. The Victorian period saw Salviati turn glass pieces, a former staple of wealth only enjoyed by a few, into ornamental pieces seen by millions throughout the homes and parlors of Italy.

During 1866, Antonio Salviati founded Compagnia Venezia Murano with British diplomat and archaeologist Austen Henry Layard. Pauly & C. - Compagnia Venezia Murano has continued to be an important producer of Venetian art glass.

Of particular historical relevance is the mosaic portrait of President Abraham Lincoln, which can be viewed today in the Senate House rooms in the United States, produced by Compagnia Venezia Murano and donated by Antonio Salviati in 1866.

Murano had been a centre of fine glasswork since the Middle Ages (producing the glass that bore its name), but the pieces were lavish and expensive specialty pieces that only the wealthy could afford. Salviati changed the face of the business by becoming the first glass factory owner to employ a large number of skilled workers to mass-produce glass intended for export. The Victorian period saw Salviati turn glass pieces, a former staple of wealth enjoyed by a few, into ornamental pieces seen by millions throughout the homes and parlors of Italy. This re-established Murano as a centre for glass manufacture.

Salviati died on 25 January 1890 in Venice, Italy.

Works in Europe 
Salviati's work spread mainly to England and France, where his work was best associated with the architectural design style of these countries. His mosaics can be seen in many churches across these countries. His smaller, mass produced work, stayed relative to Italy being sold as retail.

Germany

Aachen

Berlin

Heringsdorf

Great Britain 
Tamworth 

Church of St Editha- the High altar reredos decorated with mosaic work in 1887

Biggleswade 
Church of St Andrew in Biggleswade - a stone reredos decorated in 1881.

London 

The chapel at Fulham Palace includes a reredos by Salviati depicting the nativity. The Palace including the chapel is open for free daily, from 10.30 - 17.00 (10.30 - 16.00 winter).

Dundee 
www.saintpaulscathedral.net Mosaic reredos of Christ in glory in St Paul's Episcopal Cathedral

Durham 
West Rainton St. Mary's Parish Church features a large reredos by Salviati.

Elsfield 
St. Thomas of Canterbury church, Elsfield, has a Salviati mosaic of The Last Supper.

Liverpool 

The church of St. Bridget with St. Thomas, Wavertree, has a Salviati mosaic of the Last Supper, dating from 1872.

Reading 

All Saints Church, Reading, Berkshire, has a Salviati glass mosaic reredos depicting the Last Supper, that was installed in 1866.

Torquay
Mosaic work in the chancel of St John's Church, Torquay installed in 1866.

Italy

Venice

Poland

Lodz 
 Mosaic in Carl von Scheibler's palace, Lodz, Poland, 2 Zwycięstwa; now Museum of [Polish] Cinematography :pl:Muzeum Kinematografii w Łodzi and about C. Scheibler's palace:

See also 
Salviati (glassmakers)

References 
2. "Archived Copy". "Britannica Online. Retrieved 2016-10-2021
Gable, Carl I., Murano Magic: Complete Guide to Venetian Glass, its History and Artists (Schiffer, 2004), p. 207.
"Antonio Salviati." Encyclopædia Britannica Online. Encyclopædia Britannica, n.d. Web. 21 Oct. 2016.
Kovach, R. S. "Locations." The Salviati Architectural Mosaic Database:. Blogger, n.d. Web. 26 Oct. 2016.

External links 
Official Site of Pauly & C. | CVM – Compagnia Venezia Murano

Italian glass artists
Venetian glass
1816 births
1890 deaths
People from Vicenza
Italian businesspeople